Rami Abdel-Majeed Hassan Samara ( is a Jordanian football player who currently plays as a midfielder for Al-Ramtha SC.

Rami's father is Abdel-Majeed Samara, former head coach of Al-Ramtha SC, and his uncle is Abdel-Haleem Samara, president of Al-Ramtha SC.

International career
Rami's first match with the Jordan national team was against Cyprus in an international friendly at Nicosia, May 19, 2004, when both teams ended the match with a 0-0 draw.

Honors and Participation in International Tournaments

In Pan Arab Games 
2011 Pan Arab Games

References

External links
 
 
 goal.com
 

1983 births
Living people
Jordanian footballers
Jordan international footballers
Association football midfielders
Al-Ramtha SC players
Al-Hussein SC (Irbid) players